The Atari 1020 was a four-color computer plotter sold by Atari, Inc. for the Atari 8-bit home computers.

The 1020 was based on a plotter mechanism manufactured by ALPS. The same mechanism formed the basis of several other low-cost plotters produced around the same time, including the Commodore 1520, the Oric MCP40, the Tandy/Radio Shack CGP-115, the Texas Instruments HX-1000 and the Mattel Aquarius 4615. However, the 1020 connected via the Atari 8-bit's proprietary SIO interface, eliminating the need for an 850 serial/parallel interface module, but limiting its use to Atari 8-bit computers.

The 1020 was capable of 20-, 40- and 80-column text and graphics using a friction-fed roll of paper approximately 11.5 cm (4.5 inches) in width. Graphics were generated using one of four coloured pens to draw lines, using a combination of the horizontally moving pen barrel and the vertically scrolling paper to create diagonal lines.

Control of the plotter was possible from Atari BASIC.

References

External links
 COMPUTE! ISSUE 36 / MAY 1983 / PAGE 20 - "The New Low-Cost Printer/Plotters"

1020
Computer printers